Martins's tamarin (Saguinus martinsi) or Martin's ochraceous bare-face tamarin, is a species of tamarin endemic to Brazil.

Taxonomy 
Martin's tamarin is a monkey in the genus Saguinus. It has two subspecies: S. m. martinsi and S. m. ochraceus. Both subspecies were formerly considered to be subspecies of the pied tamarin: Saguinus bicolor martinsi and S. b. ochraceus. Subspecies martinsi is commonly known as Martin's bare-face tamarin; subspecies ochraceus is commonly known as the ochraceous bare-faced tamarin.

References

Martins's tamarin
Mammals of Brazil
Endemic fauna of Brazil
Martins's tamarin
Martins's tamarin